Ronald Waldock (born 6 December 1932) is an English former professional footballer. Born in Heanor in Derbyshire, he played for Coventry City, Sheffield United, Scunthorpe United, Plymouth Argyle, Middlesbrough and Gillingham between 1950 and 1964.

References

1932 births
Living people
People from Heanor
Footballers from Derbyshire
English footballers
Association football forwards
Gillingham F.C. players
Coventry City F.C. players
Sheffield United F.C. players
Scunthorpe United F.C. players
Plymouth Argyle F.C. players
Middlesbrough F.C. players
Margate F.C. players